Kazachstania humilis (prev. Candida humilis) is a species of yeast in the genus Kazachstania. It commonly occurs in sourdough and kefir cultures, along with different species of lactic acid bacteria (e.g., Limosilactobacillus fermentum, Companilactobacillus paralimentarius, Lactiplantibacillus plantarum, and Fructilactobacillus sanfranciscensis).  K. humilis is the most representative yeast species found in type I sourdough ecosystems. The effects of electric field strength, pulse width and frequency, or pulse shape is significant on the membranes of Candida humilis, but not very noticeable.

K. humilis was separated from C. milleri in The Yeasts (fifth edition) in September 2016, although this is not universally accepted and they are still considered synonymous.

References

Fungi described in 1968
Yeasts
humilis